Caddo Mills High School is a public school located in Caddo Mills, Texas (USA). It is part of the Caddo Mills Independent School District.  In 2013, the school was rated "Met Standard" by the Texas Education Agency. The growth of nearby Dallas has caused a rise in enrollment in recent years.

References

External links
 Caddo Mills Independent School District
 Caddo Mills Chamber of Commerce

Schools in Hunt County, Texas
Public high schools in Texas